This is a list of middle schools in the state of Kentucky.

If necessary, the schools are split into public and private, and also by district. Note that Kentucky has two types of public school districts: county districts, styled "XXXX County (Public) Schools" or in some cases "XXXX County School District"; and independent districts, which have varying styles with the common element of not including the word "County". Unless specified, public schools are affiliated with their associated county district.

Adair County

Adair County Schools
Adair County Middle School, Columbia

Allen County
Allen County Schools
James E. Bazzell Middle School, Scottsville

Anderson County

Anderson County Schools
Anderson County Middle School, Lawrenceburg
Private
Christian Academy of Lawrenceburg, Lawrenceburg

Ballard County

Ballard County Schools
Ballard County Middle School, Barlow

Barren County

Barren County Schools
Barren County Middle School, Glasgow
Glasgow Independent Schools
Glasgow Middle School, Glasgow
Private
Glasgow Christian Academy, Glasgow

Bath County
Bath County Schools
Bath County Middle School, Owingsville

Bell County
Bell County Schools
Bell Central School Center, Pineville
Frakes School Center, Frakes
Lone Jack School Center, Fourmile
Page School Center, Pineville
Right Fork School Center, Kettle Island
Yellow Creek School Center, Middlesboro
Middlesboro Independent Schools
Middlesboro Middle School, Middlesboro
Pineville Independent Schools
Pineville Middle School, Pineville

Boone County
Boone County Schools
Ballyshannon Middle School, Union
Camp Ernst Middle School, Burlington
Conner Middle School, Hebron
Gray Middle School, Union
Ockerman Middle School, Florence
R. A. Jones Middle School, Florence
Walton-Verona Independent Schools
Walton-Verona Middle School, Walton
Private
Heritage Academy, Florence

Bourbon County
Bourbon County Schools
Bourbon County Middle School, Paris
Paris Independent Schools
Paris Middle School, Paris
Private
Bourbon Christian Academy, Paris

Boyd County
Ashland Independent Schools
George M. Verity Middle School, Ashland
Boyd County Public Schools
Boyd County Middle School, Ashland
Fairview Independent Schools
Fairview High School (6th-12th), Westwood
Private
Rose Hill Christian School, Ashland

Boyle County
Boyle County Schools
Boyle County Middle School, Danville
Danville Independent Schools
John W. Bate Middle School, Danville
Private
Danville Christian Academy, Danville
State-operated
Kentucky School for the Deaf, Danville

Bracken County
Augusta Independent Schools
Augusta Junior High School, Augusta
Bracken County Schools
Bracken County Middle School, Brooksville

Private

Saint Augustine School, Augusta

Breathitt County
Breathitt County Schools
Eugene Sebastian Middle School, Jackson
Jackson Independent Schools
Jackson City School (Pre-k-12th), Jackson

Breckinridge County
Breckinridge County Schools
Breckinridge County Middle School, Harned

Bullitt County
Bullitt County Public Schools
Bernheim Middle School, Shepherdsville
Bullitt Lick Middle School, Shepherdsville
Eastside Middle School, Mount Washington
Hebron Middle School, Shepherdsville
Mount Washington Middle School, Mount Washington
Zoneton Middle School, Shepherdsville

Butler County
Butler County Schools
Butler County Middle School, Morgantown

Caldwell County
Caldwell County Schools
Caldwell County Middle School, Princeton

Calloway County
Calloway County Schools, Murray
Calloway County Middle School
Murray Independent Schools
Murray Middle School, Murray

Campbell County
Campbell County Schools
Campbell County Middle School, Alexandria

Carlisle County

Carlisle County Public Schools
Carlisle County Middle School, Bardwell

Carroll County

Carroll County Schools
Carroll County Middle School, Carrollton

Carter County

Carter County Schools
East Carter Middle School, Grayson
West Carter Middle School, Olive Hill

Casey County

Casey County Schools
Casey County Middle School, Liberty

Christian County

Christian County Public Schools
Christian County Middle School, Hopkinsville
Hopkinsville Middle School, Hopkinsville
North Drive Middle School, Hopkinsville

Clark County

Clark County Public Schools
Clark Middle School, Winchester
Conkwright Middle School, Winchester

Clay County

Clay County Public Schools
Clay County Middle School, Manchester

Clinton County

Clinton County Schools
Clinton County Middle School, Albany

Crittenden County

Crittenden County Schools
Crittenden County Middle School, Marion

Cumberland County

Cumberland County Schools
Cumberland County Middle School, Burkesville

Daviess County

Daviess County Public Schools
College View Middle School, Owensboro
Daviess County Middle School Owensboro
F.T. Burns Middle School, Owensboro
Owensboro Public Schools
Owensboro Middle School, Owensboro

Edmonson County

Edmonson County Schools
Edmonson County Middle School, Brownsville

Elliott County

Elliott County Schools
Elliott County High School (7th-12th), Sandy Hook

Estill County

Estill County Schools
Estill County Middle School, Irvine

Fayette County

Fayette County Public Schools
Beaumont Middle School, Lexington
Bryan Station Middle School, Lexington
Crawford Middle School, Lexington
E.J. Hayes Middle School, Lexington
Jessie Clark Middle School, Lexington
Leestown Middle School, Lexington
Lexington Traditional Middle School, Lexington
Morton Middle School, Lexington
Tates Creek Middle School, Lexington
Winburn Middle School, Lexington
Southern Middle School, Lexington

Fleming County

Fleming County Schools
Simons Middle School, Flemingsburg

Floyd County

Floyd County Schools
Allen Central Middle School, Eastern
James D. Adams Middle School, Prestonsburg
Betsy Layne Middle School, Betsy Layne, Kentucky
South Floyd Middle School, Hi Hat

Franklin County

Frankfort Independent Schools
Second Street Elementary School (Pre-k-8th), Frankfort
Wilkinson Street School (6th-12th), Frankfort
Franklin County Public Schools
Bondurant Middle School, Frankfort
Elkhorn Middle School, Frankfort

Fulton County

Fulton County Schools
Fulton County Middle School, Hickman
Fulton Independent Schools
Fulton City High School (7th-12th), Fulton

Gallatin County

Gallatin County Schools
Gallatin County Middle School, Warsaw

Garrard County

Garrard County Schools
Garrard Middle School, Lancaster

Grant County

Grant County Schools
Grant County Middle School, Dry Ridge
Williamstown Independent Schools
Williamstown High School (6th-12th), Williamstown

Graves County

Graves County Schools
Graves County Middle School, Mayfield
Mayfield Independent Schools
Mayfield Middle School, Mayfield

Grayson County

Grayson County Schools
Grayson County Middle School, Leitchfield

Green County

Green County Schools
Green County Middle School, Greensburg

Greenup County

Greenup County Schools
McKell Middle School, South Shore
Wurtland Middle School, Wurtland
Raceland-Worthington Independent Schools
Raceland-Worthington High School (7th-12th), Raceland
Russell Independent Schools
Russell Middle School, Russell

Hancock County

Hancock County Schools
Hancock County Middle School, Lewisport

Hardin County

Elizabethtown Independent Schools
Talton K. Stone Middle School, Elizabethtown
Hardin County Schools
Bluegrass Middle School, Elizabethtown
East Hardin Middle School, Glendale
James T. Alton Middle School, Vine Grove
North Middle School, Radcliff
West Hardin Middle School, Cecilia
West Point Independent Schools
West Point Elementary School (Pre-k-8th), West Point

Harlan County

Harlan County Public Schools
Black Mountain Elementary School (Pre-k-12th), Kenvir
Cumberland High School (7th-12th), Cumberland
Cawood Elementary School (K-8th), Cawood
Evarts Elementary School (K-8th), Evarts
Green Hills Elementary (Pre-k-8th), Bledsoe
Hall Elementary School (Pre-k-8th), Grays Knob
Rosspoint Elementary School (K-8th), Baxter
Wallins Elementary School (Pre-k-8th), Wallins
Harlan Independent Schools
Harlan High School (5th-12th), Harlan

Harrison County

Harrison County Schools
Harrison County Middle School, Cynthiana

Hart County

Caverna Independent Schools
Caverna Middle School, Horse Cave
Hart County Schools
Hart County High School (8th-12th), Munfordville

Henderson County

Henderson County Schools
Henderson County North Middle School, Henderson
Henderson County South Middle School, Henderson

Henry County

Eminence Independent Schools
Eminence High School (5th-12th), Eminence
Henry County Schools
Henry County Middle School, New Castle

Hickman County

Hickman County Schools
Hickman County High School (7th-12th), Clinton

Hopkins County

Dawson Springs Independent Schools
Dawson Springs Middle School, Dawson Springs

Jackson County

Jackson County Public Schools
Jackson County Middle School, Mckee

Jefferson County

Anchorage Independent Schools
Anchorage Public Elementary School (K-8th), Anchorage
Jefferson County Public Schools
Barret Traditional Middle School, Louisville
Brown School, Louisville
Carrithers Middle School, Louisville
Conway Middle School, Louisville
Crosby Middle School, Louisville
Farnsley Middle School, Louisville
Frederick Law Olmsted Academy North, Louisville
Frederick Law Olmsted Academy South, Louisville
Highland Middle School, Louisville
Jefferson County Traditional Middle School, Louisville
Johnson Traditional Middle School, Louisville
Kammerer Middle School, Louisville
Kennedy Metro Middle School, Louisville
Knight Middle School, Louisville
Lassiter Middle School, Louisville
Meyzeek Middle School, Louisville
Moore Traditional, Louisville
Myers Middle School, Louisville
Newburg Middle School, Louisville
Noe Middle School, Louisville
Ramsey Middle School, Louisville
Robert Frost Sixth Grade Academy, Louisville
Stuart Middle School, Louisville
The Academy @ Shawnee, Louisville
Thomas Jefferson Middle School, Louisville
Valley Preparatory Academy, Louisville
Western Middle School, Louisville
Westport Middle School, Louisville
State-operated
Kentucky School for the Blind, Louisville

Jessamine County

Jessamine County Schools
East Jessamine County Middle School, Nicholasville
West Jessamine Middle School, Nicholasville

Johnson County

Johnson County Schools
Johnson County Middle School, Paintsville
Paintsville Independent Schools
Paintsville High School (7th-12th), Paintsville

Kenton County

Beechwood Independent Schools
Beechwood High School (7th-12th), Fort Mitchell
Covington Independent Public Schools
Holmes Junior High School, Covington
Two Rivers Middle School, Covington
Erlanger-Elsmere Independent Schools
Tichenor Middle School, Erlanger
Kenton County Schools
Summit View Middle School, Independence
Turkey Foot Middle School, Edgewood
Twenhofel Middle School, Independence
Woodland Middle School, Taylor Mill
Ludlow Independent Schools
Ludlow Middle School, Ludlow

Knott County

Knott County Schools
Beaver Creek Elementary School (K-8th), Topmost
Beckham Combs Elementary School (K-8th), Vest
Caney Creek Elementary School (K-8th), Pippa Passes
Carr Creek Elementary School (K-8th), Littcarr
Emmalena Elementary School (Pre-k-8th), Emmalena
Hindman Elementary School (Pre-k-8th), Hindman
Jones Fork Elementary School (Pre-k-8th), Mousie

Knox County

Barbourville Independent Schools
Barbourville High School (7th-12th), Barbourville
Knox County Public Schools
Artemus Middle School (Pre-k-8th), Artemus
Boone Elementary School (K-8th), Barbourville
Dewitt Elementary School (K-8th), Dewitt
Flat Lick Elementary School (K-8th), Flat Lick
Girdler Elementary School (K-8th), Girdler
Hampton Elementary School (Pre-k-8th), Barbourville
Jesse D. Lay Elementary School (Pre-k-8th), Barbourville

LaRue County

LaRue County Schools
LaRue County Middle School, Hodgenville

Laurel County

East Bernstadt Independent Schools
East Bernstadt Elementary School (Pre-k-8th), East Bernstadt
Laurel County Schools
North Laurel Middle School, London
South Laurel Middle School, London

Lawrence County

Lawrence County Schools
Blaine Elementary School (Pre-k-8th), Blaine
Fallsburg Elementary School (Pre-k-8th), Fallsburg
Louisa Middle School, Louisa

Lee County

Lee County Schools
Lee County Middle School, Beattyville

Leslie County

Leslie County Schools
Leslie County Middle School, Hyden

Letcher County

Jenkins Independent Schools
Jenkins Middle School, Jenkins
Letcher County Schools
Arlie Boggs Elementary School (Pre-k-8th), Eolia
Beckham Bates Elementary School (K-8th), Whitesburg
Cowan Elementary School (K-8th), Whitesburg
Fleming-Neon Elementary (K-8th), Fleming-Neon
Kingdom Come Settlement Elementary School, Linefork
Letcher Elementary School (K-8th), Letcher
Martha Jane Potter Elementary School (K-8th), Whitesburg
Whitesburg Middle School, Whitesburg

Lewis County

Lewis County Schools
Lewis County Middle School, Vanceburg

Lincoln County

Lincoln County Schools
Lincoln County Middle School, Stanford

Livingston County

Livingston County Schools
Livingston County Middle School, Burna

Logan County

Logan County Schools
Adairville Elementary School (Pre-k-8th), Adairville
Auburn Elementary School  (Pre-k-8th), Auburn
Chandlers Elementary School (Pre-k-8th), Russellville
Lewisburg Elementary School (Pre-k-8th), Lewisburg
Olmstead Elementary School (Pre-k-8th), Olmstead
Russellville Independent Schools
Russellville Middle School, Russellville

Lyon County

Lyon County Schools
Lyon County Middle School, Eddyville

Madison County

Berea Independent Schools
Berea Community Middle School, Berea
Madison County Schools
Clark Moore Middle School, Richmond
Foley Middle School, Berea
Madison Middle School, Richmond
Model Laboratory Middle School, Richmond

Magoffin County

Magoffin County Schools
Herald Whitaker Middle School, Salyersville

Marion County

Marion County Schools
Lebanon Middle School, Lebanon
Saint Charles Middle School, Lebanon
Saint Augustine Middle School, Lebanon, Kentucky

Marshall County

Marshall County Schools
Benton Middle School, Benton
North Marshall Middle School, Calvert County
South Marshall Middle School, Benton

Martin County

Martin County Schools
Inez Middle School, Inez
Warfield Middle School, Warfield

Mason County

Mason County Schools
Mason County Middle School, Maysville

McCracken County

McCracken County Public Schools
Heath Middle School, West Paducah
Lone Oak Middle School, Paducah
Reidland Middle School, Paducah
Paducah Independent Schools
Paducah Middle School, Paducah

McCreary County

McCreary County Schools
Pine Knot Middle School, Pine Knot
Whitley City Middle School, Whitley City

McLean County

McLean County Schools
McLean County Middle School, Calhoun

Meade County

Meade County Schools
Stuart Pepper Middle School, Brandenburg

Menifee County

Menifee County Middle School, Frenchburg

Mercer County

Burgin Independent Schools
Burgin High School (6th-12th), Burgin
Harrodsburg Independent Schools
Harrodsburg Middle School, Harrodsburg
Mercer County Schools
Kenneth D. King Middle School, Harrodsburg

Metcalfe County

Metcalfe County Schools
Metcalfe County Middle School, Edmonton

Monroe County

Monroe County Schools
Monroe County Middle School, Tompkinsville

Montgomery County

Montgomery County Schools
McNabb Middle School, Mount Sterling

Morgan County

Morgan County Schools
Morgan County Middle School, West Liberty

Muhlenberg County

Muhlenberg County Schools
Muhlenberg North Middle School, Powderly
Muhlenberg South Middle School, Greenville

Nelson County

Bardstown Independent Schools
Bardstown Middle School, Bardstown
Nelson County Schools
Bloomfield Middle School, Bloomfield
Old Kentucky Home Middle School, Bardstown

Nicholas County

Nicholas County Schools
Nicholas County Elementary School (K-8th), Carlisle

Ohio County

Ohio County Schools
Ohio County Middle School, Hartford

Oldham County

Oldham County Schools
East Oldham Middle School, Crestwood
North Oldham Middle School, Goshen
Oldham County Middle School, Buckner
South Oldham Middle School, Crestwood
Private
St. Aloysius School, Pewee Valley

Owen County

Owen County Schools
Bowling Middle School, Owenton

Owsley County

Owsley County Schools
Owsley County High School (7th-12th), Booneville

Pendleton County

Pendleton County Schools
Phillip A. Sharp Middle School, Butler

Perry County

Hazard Independent Schools
Roy G. Eversole Middle School, Hazard
Perry County Schools
A.B. Combs Elementary School (K-8th), Combs
Big Creek Elementary School (Pre-k-8th), Avawam
Buckhorn Elementary School (K-8th), Buckhorn
Chavies Elementary School (K-8th), Chavies
Leatherwood Elementary School (K-8th), Leatherwood
Lost Creek Elementary School (Pre-k-8th), Dice
Robert W. Combs Elementary School (Pre-k-8th), Happy
Robinson Elementary School (Pre-k-8th), Ary
Viper Elementary School (Pre-k-8th), Viper
Willard Elementary School (K-8th), Busy

Pike County

Pike County Schools
Belfry Middle School, Belfry
Johns Creek Elementary School (Pre-k-8th), Johns Creek
Millard Middle School, Millard
Turkey Creek Middle School, Turkey Creek
Virgie Middle School, Virgie
Pikeville Independent Schools 
Pikeville High School (7th-12th), Pikeville

Powell County

Powell County Schools
Powell County Middle School, Stanton

Pulaski County

Pulaski County Schools
Northern Middle School, Somerset
Southern Middle School, Somerset
Science Hill Independent Schools
Science Hill Elementary School (Pre-k-8th), Science Hill
Somerset Independent Schools
Meece Middle School, Somerset

Robertson County

Robertson County Schools
Deming High School (7th-12th), Mount Olivet

Rockcastle County

Rockcastle County Schools
Rockcastle County Middle School, Mount Vernon

Rowan County

Rowan County Schools
Rowan County Middle School, Morehead

Russell County

Russell County Schools
Russell County Middle School, Russell Springs

Scott County

Scott County Schools
Georgetown Middle School, Georgetown
Scott County Middle School, Georgetown
Royal Spring Middle School, Georgetown, Kentucky

Shelby County

Shelby County Public Schools
Shelby County East Middle School, Shelbyville
Shelby County West Middle School, Shelbyville
Private
Cornerstone Christian Academy, Shelbyville
Our Lady of Guadalupe Academy, Simpsonville

Simpson County

Simpson County Schools
Franklin-Simpson Middle School, Franklin

Spencer County

Spencer County Schools
Spencer County Middle School, Taylorsville

Taylor County

Campbellsville Independent Schools
Campbellsville Middle School, Campbellsville
Taylor County Schools
Taylor County Middle School, Campbellsville

Todd County

Todd County Schools
Todd County Middle School, Elkton

Trigg County

Trigg County Public Schools
Trigg County Middle School, Cadiz

Trimble County

Trimble County Schools
Trimble County Middle School, Bedford

Union County

Union County Public Schools
Union County Middle School, Morganfield

Warren County

Bowling Green Independent Schools
Bowling Green Middle School, Bowling Green
Warren County Schools
Drakes Creek Middle School, Bowling Green
Henry F. Moss Middle School, Bowling Green
Warren East Middle School, Bowling Green

Washington County

Washington County Schools
Washington County Middle School, Springfield

Wayne County

Monticello Independent Schools
Monticello Middle School, Monticello
Wayne County Schools
A.J. Lloyd Middle School, Monticello
Wayne County Alternative Middle School, Monticello

Webster County

Providence Independent Schools
Broadway Elementary School (Pre-k-8th), Providence
Webster County Schools
Clay Elementary School (Pre-k-8th), Clay
Dixon Elementary School (Pre-k-8th), Dixon
Sebree Elementary School (Pre-k-8th), Sebree
Slaughters Elementary School (Pre-k-8th), Slaughters

Whitley County

Corbin Independent Schools
Corbin Middle School, Corbin
Whitley County Schools
Whitley County Middle School, Williamsburg
Williamsburg Independent Schools
Williamsburg City School (Pre-k-12th), Williamsburg

Wolfe County

Wolfe County Schools
Wolfe County Middle School, Campton

Woodford County

Woodford County Schools
Woodford County Middle School, Versailles

See also

List of high schools in Kentucky
List of school districts in Kentucky

References

Middle

Kentucky